Saint-Bernard is a municipality in the Municipalité régionale de comté de la Nouvelle-Beauce in Quebec, Canada. It is part of the Chaudière-Appalaches region and the population is 2,535 as of 2021. Constituted in 1845, it is named after Archbishop Bernard-Claude Panet.

The municipality is located on scenic Route 171 in Beauce.

On August 26, 1972, five days after escaping from Saint-Vincent-de-Paul jail in Laval, Quebec, notorious French criminal Jacques Mesrine and his Quebec accomplice Jean-Paul Mercier robbed the Caisse populaire of Saint-Bernard. Ten minutes later, they robbed the caisse of Saint-Narcisse-de-Beaurivage, for a total of $26,000 that day.

All of the victims of the 1997 Les Éboulements bus accident save one, the bus driver, were senior citizens from Saint-Bernard.

Demographics
Population
Population trend:

Language
Mother tongue language (2021)

References

Commission de toponymie du Québec
Ministère des Affaires municipales, des Régions et de l'Occupation du territoire

Municipalities in Quebec
Incorporated places in Chaudière-Appalaches
Designated places in Quebec